Iswarya Menon is an Indian actress who predominantly works in the Tamil and Telugu films.

Early life and education 
Iswarya Menon's family hails from Chendamangalam, Kerala, but she was born and brought up in Erode, Tamil Nadu. She did her schooling in Erode. She did her higher secondary education at Vellalar Matriculation School, Erode. She completed her Instrumentation engineering from SRM Institute of Science and technology.

Career
Iswarya Menon debuted in Tamil cinema in Kadhalil Sodhappuvadhu Yeppadi. She debuted as Akshara in the Kannada industry with Dasavala which was directed by M S Ramesh. She was cast opposite Prem, of Jogi fame. The film released on 11 October 2013 and her performance as a mentally challenged girl was generally well received.

Menon's next release was the Tamil film Apple Penne. It was based on a mother and daughter relationship, with Iswarya as the daughter, and Roja Selvamani as her mother. She next appeared in the Kannada horror comedy Namo Bhootatma.

Co-starring Fahadh Faasil, she made her next Malayalam debut in the romance film Monsoon Mangoes, in which she portrays Rekha, a "practical and independent young woman". She then appeared in CS Amudhan's Tamizh Padam 2.

Filmography

Film

Web series

References

External links 
 
 

Living people
21st-century Indian actresses
Actresses from Chennai
Actresses from Tamil Nadu
Actresses in Malayalam cinema
Actresses in Tamil cinema
Actresses in Telugu cinema
Indian film actresses
People from Erode district
1995 births